Biswa Ranjan Nag (1 October 1932 – 6 April 2004) was an Indian physicist and the Sisir Kumar Mitra chair professor at Rajabazar Science College, University of Calcutta. Known for his research in semiconductor physics, Nag was an elected fellow of Indian National Science Academy and Indian Academy of Sciences. The Council of Scientific and Industrial Research, the apex agency of the Government of India for scientific research, awarded him the Shanti Swarup Bhatnagar Prize for Science and Technology, one of the highest Indian science awards for his contributions to Physical Sciences in 1974.

Biography 

Born on 1 October 1932 to Sailabala and Satyaranjan Nag at Comilla, a city along the Dhaka-Chittagong Highway in the undivided Bengal of the British India (presently in Bangladesh), B. R. Nag did his graduate studies at Presidency College, Calcutta during 1949–51 and earned a master's degree in technology (M.Tech.) from the Institute of Radiophysics and Electronics (IRE) at the Rajabazar Science College campus of the University of Calcutta in 1954. He started his career in 1956 as a faculty member at IRE and simultaneously pursued doctoral studies, mentored by Arun K. Choudhury. In between, he spent one year at University of Wisconsin obtaining an MS in 1959.  Mr. Nag returned to Calcutta to resume his doctoral work, and earned his PhD in 1961. Continuing his teaching career, he became a full professor in 1968. Further research which earned him a Doctor of Science degree from Calcutta University in 1972. He served out his regular academic career at the university and continued his association past his superannuation in 1997 as its Sisir Kumar Mitra professor. In between, he also served as a Commonwealth Visiting Professor at Bangor, Gwynedd.

Nag was married to Mridula Roy Choudhury and the couple had two children, Biswadeep and Mriduchanda. He died on 6 April 2004 in Kolkata, at the age of 71.

Legacy 

Nag's work focused on semiconductors and it helped in widening our understanding of the electrical transport phenomena in those high electrical resistant solids. During his early years at Calcutta University, he led a group of students who were engaged in the studies on microwave measurements of semiconductor properties and did advanced research on Gunn effect and microwave radiation. He demonstrated the temperature independence of Two-dimensional electron gas and its alloy scattering limited mobility which was a first time discovery. His studies revealed the non-parabolic nature of electron energy dispersion in narrow quantum wells and this modified the theory of interface roughness scattering limited mobility for Quantum Wells with finite barrier height and Well width. Liquid phase Epitaxy Semiconducting III–V compounds, acousto-electric effect and free carrier absorption, Gini ratio and Si coefficient related to hot-electron galvanomagnetic transport were some of the other areas of his research. He contributed to the development of electron transport theory related to semiconductors and developed a Monte Carlo method for the computation of coefficients related to velocity correlation, diffusion and noise parameters. His body of work is reported to have relevance to the fields of microwave communications and radar, especially in the development of microwave semiconductor devices. His studies have been documented by way of a number of articles and the article repository of the Indian Academy of Sciences has listed 190 of them. He authored three monographs, Theory of electrical transport in semiconductors, Physics of Quantum Well Devices and Electron Transport in Compound Semiconductors of which the last mentioned is reported to be a significant reference text for researchers. He also contributed chapters to books published by others and his work has drawn citations in a number of books.

Awards and honors 
Nag, a founder fellow of the Indian National Academy of Engineering, received the J. C. Bose Memorial Prize of the British Institution of Radio Engineers in 1964. The Council of Scientific and Industrial Research awarded him the Shanti Swarup Bhatnagar Prize, one of the highest Indian science awards in 1974. He was selected for the Jawaharlal Nehru Fellowship in 1975 and the Indian National Science Academy elected him as a fellow in 1978; the academy would honor him again in 1993 with the INSA Prize for Materials Science. He became an elected fellow of the Indian Academy of Sciences. The department of radio physics and electronics of the University of Calcutta instituted an annual conference, International Conference on Computers and devices for Communication (CODEC), in his honor in 1998, a year after Nag retired from academic service.

Selected bibliography

Books

Chapters

Articles

See also 

 Phonon
 List of semiconductor materials
 Einstein relation (kinetic theory)
 Electron mobility

Notes

References

External links 
 
 

1932 births
2004 deaths
People from Comilla
20th-century Indian physicists
Indian technology writers
University of Calcutta alumni
Academic staff of the University of Calcutta
University of Wisconsin–Madison alumni
Recipients of the Shanti Swarup Bhatnagar Award in Medical Science
Fellows of the Indian Academy of Sciences
Fellows of the Indian National Science Academy
Fellows of the Indian National Academy of Engineering
Jawaharlal Nehru Fellows
Bengali scientists
Indian crystallographers
Scientists from Kolkata